Robert John Dyer (born 21 April 1959) is a former English cricketer.  Dyer was a right-handed batsman who bowled right-arm off break.  He was born in Birmingham. he is father to former Aston Villa and burton Albion footballer Jack Dyer.

Dyer made his debut for Staffordshire in the 1989 Minor Counties Championship against Norfolk.  Dyer played Minor counties cricket for Staffordshire from 1989 to 1992, which included 5 Minor Counties Championship matches and 4 MCCA Knockout Trophy matches.  In 1990, he made his List A debut against Northamptonshire in the NatWest Trophy.  He played a further List A match against Warwickshire in the 1992 NatWest Trophy.  In his 2 List A matches, he failed to score any runs and failed to take any wickets in the 15 overs be bowled.

References

External links
Robert Dyer at ESPNcricinfo

1959 births
Living people
Cricketers from Birmingham, West Midlands
English cricketers
Staffordshire cricketers
English cricketers of 1969 to 2000